Beinn Chabhair (Gaelic: Beinn a' Chabhair) is a Scottish mountain. It has fine views down to Loch Lomond.

A common approach is from Inverarnan, up a steep eroded path beside the dramatic waterfalls of the Ben Glas Burn then finding a vague route across fairly level but very boggy moorland before walking up the hill itself and finding a way around a series of craggy outcrops to the summit.

References

 The Munros, Scottish Mountaineering Trust, 1986, Donald Bennett (Editor) 

Munros
Mountains and hills of Stirling (council area)
Mountains and hills of the Southern Highlands
Marilyns of Scotland